New Hartford is an unincorporated community in New Hartford Township, Winona County, Minnesota, United States.  The Pine Creek (Mississippi River tributary) flows through New Hartford.

Notes

Unincorporated communities in Winona County, Minnesota
Unincorporated communities in Minnesota